The Manta Rays of Time is Bill Callahan's fourth EP released under his Smog moniker. It was released in Australia only on Spunk Records in 2000. "Real Live Dress" later appeared on the 2002 rarities compilation Accumulation: None, while the remaining two tracks on the EP are exclusive to this release. Real Live Dress features elements from Baby Got Back by Sir Mix-a-Lot. When questioned on the use of these elements Bill said he thinks the lines are "pure and true" and that he included them without irony as he admired their "clarity".

Track listing
 "Real Live Dress" – 5:25
 "Pure Sunshine" – 4:03
 "Bored Bayou" – 3:51

References

2000 EPs
Bill Callahan (musician) EPs